Ydre Østerbro (lit. English: Outer Østerbro) is an area in Copenhagen, Denmark. It is the part of the district of Østerbro located farthest from the City Centre. It lies on the northeast border of the municipality. It covers an area of 5.08 km2, has a population of 35,937 and a population density of 7,081 per km2.

Neighboring city districts are as follows:
 to the north is Gentofte municipality, which is outside of the Copenhagen municipality area
 to the west are Bispebjerg and Ydre Nørrebro
 to the south is Indre Østerbro
 to the east is Svanemølle Bay (Svanemøllebugten), an inlet of the Øresund, the strait which separates the island of Zealand from Sweden

Colloquially, the Ydre Østerbro ("Outer Østerbro"), along with its neighboring city district to the south— Indre Østerbro ("Inner Østerbro")— are often collectively referred to as "Østerbro". However, they are technically two separate legal units within the Copenhagen municipality.

Attractions 
 Lake Emdrup (Emdrup Sø)

External links 
 City of Copenhagen’s statistical office

Copenhagen city districts